The steamship Kerry Range was a 5,800-ton general cargo freighter, armed with  guns, that had been built by the Northumberland Shipbuilding Company and launched on 27 November 1915. While serving as a Royal Navy armed transport she was damaged in a fire, with loss of life, in Baltimore, Maryland, in October 1917. Investigating officials, after the fire, were convinced the vessel was the target of arson, and that the arsonists were German agents—an enemy of the United Kingdom and the United States, during World War I.  Several suspects were arrested.  However, it was later determined that the fire on Pier 9, that triggered the fire on board Kerry Range, was due to an electrical malfunction that triggered oakum, a flammable product once used to pack seams on ships. Three crew members lost their lives.  Firefighting officials towed the blazing vessel away from the pier, to help prevent it igniting nearby Pier 8, and scuttled her. It took over a day to completely put out the fires on the hulk.  Some press reports at the time wrote she was a complete write-off. However, the damaged vessel was salvaged and sold to the Steam Navigation Company of Canada in 1918.

The fireboats  and  played a key role in fighting the 1917 blaze.

In 1920, the ship's Canadian owners renamed her Blossom Heath, and in 1925 she was sold to the Dubrovnik-based Yugoslavian company Yugoslavenska Americaniska Plovidba ad. The Yugoslav owners renamed the ship Vojvoda Putnik. Three years later she was sold on to Yugoslavenski Lloyd dd, also based in Dubrovnik. Vojvoda Putnik stayed in Yugoslav service until torpedoed and sunk during World War II by the German U-boat  in the Atlantic Ocean on 8 March 1943.

References

1915 ships
Ships built on the River Tyne
Steamships of the United Kingdom
Steamships of Canada
Steamships of Yugoslavia
World War I auxiliary ships of the United Kingdom
Merchant ships of Canada
World War II merchant ships of Yugoslavia
Maritime incidents in 1917
Ship fires
Maritime incidents in March 1943
Ships sunk by German submarines in World War II
World War II shipwrecks in the Atlantic Ocean